Josef Bauer (January 25, 1881 – April 30, 1958 in Munich) was a German politician, Nazi Party member and an SS officer.

Life

Bauer, was the son of a blacksmith, and a teacher in Munich. From 1915 to 1918 he participated as a soldier in the First World War and received the Iron Cross 2nd Class.

In 1925 he became a member of the Nazi Party (NSDAP) in Munich. In 1930 he was Reich speaker and head of the Gaurednerschule.

From 1932 to 1933 Bauer was a member of the Bavarian Parliament, where he was chairman of the Nazi Party parliamentary group. From 1933 to 1937 Bauer was chairman of the regimented Bavarian Teachers Association. From 1941 he was Director of the Munich district office of the office of educators in the NS-Teachers' Association.

Bauer was also a member of the SS and in 1941 appointed an SS brigade leader.

Mein Kampf signed books

In February 2014, a rare two-volume set of Mein Kampf signed by Adolf Hitler, which had been Hitler’s holiday gift to Bauer, sold for $64,850 at Nate D. Sanders Auctions in Los Angeles.

In the autograph, Hitler sent Bauer his best wishes for the Christmas season.

External links

References

1881 births
1958 deaths
SS-Brigadeführer